Puntland State University is a university in Garowe, the administrative capital of the northeastern Puntland region of Somalia.

History
The school traces its roots back to the Garowe School of Management, a women's school in Garowe offering courses in accounting, computer skills, business English and business management. After a year of operation, which saw the graduation of 60 women, the school was expanded to a two-year structure and renamed to Puntland Community College. In 2004, in cooperation with the United Nations Development Program and USIU Nairobi, PCC was expanded to include four-year programs. It was also renamed  Puntland State University (PSU).

Degrees

Degrees offered at PSU include:
Bachelor of Science in Business Administration (BBA): two- and four-year programs
Bachelor of Science
Information technology
Public administration
Journalism
English language
Sharia and Law

The school is participating in the Puntland Resource and Service Center, which began construction in January 2007 in Garowe.

Faculties
Faculty of Business and Economics
Faculty of Social Science
Faculty of Computer Science
Faculty of Health Sciences
Faculty of Shari'a and Law

Partnership
Puntland State University has entered into a sister institution relationship with the Minneapolis Community and Technical College (MCTC) based in Minneapolis, Minnesota in the United States.

References

External links
Puntland State University
East Somalia University

Universities in Somalia
Garowe
2004 establishments in Somalia
Educational institutions established in 2004